Clancey is a surname. Notable people with the surname include:

 George Clancey (1881–1921), American actor 
 Julia Clancey  (early 21st c.), London-based fashion designer
 Margaret Clancey (1897-1989), American film editor 
 Phillip Clancey (1917–2001), British-South African ornithologist
 William Clancey (born 1952), American computer scientist

See also
 Clancy